Platystictidae is a family of damselflies, commonly known as shadowdamsels. They look very similar to the threadtail damselfly family (Protoneuridae). They can mostly be found throughout Asia, Central America, and South America.

Most members of this family live in dense forests in the tropics where they are found around streams. Their wings are narrow and their abdomen slender and elongated. The adults probably do not disperse far as many species are known from a single location or have small ranges and there are probably other species as yet undescribed.

The oldest members of the family belong to the genus Mesosticta from the Cenomanian aged Burmese amber of Myanmar.

See also 
 List of damselflies of the world (Platystictidae)

References

 

 
Odonata families